Harry Benjamin (January 12, 1885 – August 24, 1986) was a German-American endocrinologist and sexologist, widely known for his clinical work with transgender people.

Early life and career 
Benjamin was born in Berlin, and raised in a German Lutheran home. His mother was German and his father at least part-Jewish in ancestry. After premedical education in Berlin and Rostock, he joined a regiment of the Prussian Guard. He received his doctorate in medicine in 1912 in Tübingen for a dissertation on tuberculosis. Sexual medicine interested him, but was not part of his medical studies. In a 1985 interview he recalled:

Benjamin visited the United States in 1913, to work with a quack doctor who claimed to have found a cure for tuberculosis. The liner in which Benjamin was returning to Germany was caught mid-Atlantic both by the outbreak of the First World War in 1914, and the Royal Navy. Given the choice of a British internment camp, as an "enemy alien", or returning to New York, he used his last dollars to travel back to America, where he made his home for the rest of his life. However, he maintained and built many international professional connections and visited Europe frequently when wars allowed.

After several failed attempts to start a medical career in New York, in 1915 Benjamin rented a consulting room, in which he also slept, and started his own general medical practice. Later he practiced in San Francisco in the summer of every year (at 450 Sutter Street, with many of his patients coming from the nearby Tenderloin neighborhood) and otherwise at 44 East 67th Street in New York.

Work with transgender people 
Prior to arriving in the United States, Benjamin studied at the Institut für Sexualwissenschaft; from about this time onward he began to encounter and treat patients who he would later describe as transsexuals. In the 1930s he studied in Austria with Eugen Steinach. In 1948, in San Francisco, Benjamin was asked by Alfred Kinsey, a fellow sexologist, to see a young patient who was anatomically male but insisted on being female. Kinsey had encountered the child as a result of his interviews for Sexual Behavior in the Human Male, which was published that year. This case rapidly caused Benjamin's interest in what he would come to call transsexualism, realizing that there was a different condition to that of transvestism, under which adults who had such needs had been classified to that time.

Despite the psychiatrists with whom Benjamin involved in the case not agreeing on a path of treatment, Benjamin eventually decided to treat the child with estrogen (Premarin, introduced in 1941), which had a "calming effect", and helped arrange for the mother and child to go to Germany, where surgery to assist the child could be performed but, from there, they ceased to maintain contact, to Benjamin's regret. However, Benjamin continued to refine his understanding and went on to treat several hundred patients with similar needs in a similar manner, often without accepting any payment.

Many of his patients were referred by David Cauldwell, Robert Stoller, and doctors in Denmark. These doctors received hundreds of requests from individuals who had read about their work connected with changing sex, as it was then largely described.

However, due to the personal political opinions of the American doctors and a Danish law prohibiting sex reassignment surgery on noncitizens, these doctors referred the letter-writers to the one doctor of the era who would aid transsexual individuals, Harry Benjamin. Benjamin conducted treatment with the assistance of carefully selected colleagues of various disciplines (such as psychiatrists C. L. Ihlenfeld and John Alden, electrologist Martha Foss, and surgeons Jose Jesus Barbosa, Roberto C. Granato, and Georges Burou).

Benjamin's patients regarded him as a man of immense caring, respect and kindness, and many kept in touch with him until his death. He was a prolific and assiduous correspondent, in both English and German, and many letters are archived at the Magnus Hirschfeld Archive for Sexology, Humboldt University, Berlin.

The legal, social and medical background to this in the United States, as in many other countries, was often a stark contrast, since wearing items of clothing associated with the opposite sex in public was often illegal, castration of a male was often illegal, anything seen as homosexuality was often persecuted or illegal, and many doctors considered all such people (including children) at best denied any affirmation of their gender identity, or involuntarily subjected to treatments such as drugged detention, electroconvulsive therapy, or lobotomy.

Though he had already published papers and lectured to professional audiences extensively, Benjamin's 1966 book, The Transsexual Phenomenon, was immensely important as the first large work describing and explaining the affirmative treatment path he pioneered. Publicity surrounding his patient Christine Jorgensen brought the issue into the mainstream in 1952 and led to a great many people presenting for assistance, internationally. In the preface of Christine Jorgensen's autobiography, Dr. Benjamin also gives Jorgensen credit for the advancement of his studies. He wrote, "Indeed Christine, without you, probably none of this would have happened; the grant, my publications, lectures, etc."

Similar cases in other countries (such as that of Roberta Cowell, whose surgery by Harold Gillies in England was in 1951 but was not publicised until 1954; Coccinelle who received much publicity in France in 1958, and April Ashley, whose exposure in 1961 by the British tabloid press was reported worldwide) fuelled this. But most of Benjamin's patients lived (and many still live) quiet lives.

Reed Erickson (1917–1992), a successful industrialist, sought treatment from Benjamin in 1963. Erickson was the founder and funder of the Erickson Educational Foundation, which published educational booklets, funded medical conferences, counselling services, and the establishment of gender clinics. The EEF funded the Harry Benjamin Foundation.

Other work and interests 
Apart from endocrinology and sexology, he worked on life extension and would now also be described as a gerontologist. Benjamin himself lived to be 101.

Benjamin was married to Gretchen, to whom he dedicated his 1966 major work, for 60 years.

In 1979 the Harry Benjamin International Gender Dysphoria Association was formed, using Benjamin's name by permission. The group consists of therapists and psychologists who devised a set of Standards of Care (SOC) for the treatment of gender dysphoria, largely based on Benjamin's cases, and studies. It later changed its name to The World Professional Association for Transgender Health (WPATH).

Bibliography 
 The Sex Problem and the Armed Forces (1944) ASIN: B0056ASJFW
 
 
 
 
 
 
 
 
 
 
 
 Introduction to Prostitution and Morality: a Definitive Report on the Prostitute in Contemporary Society and an Analysis of the Causes and Effects of the Suppression (Robert E.L. Masters, 1964) ASIN: B000WG6JF2
 Introduction to Forbidden Sexual Behavior and Morality: An Objective Re-Examination of Perverse Sex Practices in Different Cultures (Robert E.L. Masters, 1964) 
 
 The Transsexual Phenomenon; a Scientific Report on Transsexualism and Sex Conversion in the Human Male and Female, (1966) ASIN: B0007HXA76
 Introduction to Christine Jorgensen; Personal Autobiography (Christine Jorgenssen, 1967)

See also 
 Benjamin scale
 List of transgender-related topics
 Eugen Steinach
 Second Serve

Notes

References

External links 

 The Transsexual Phenomenon; a Scientific Report on Transsexualism and Sex Conversion in the Human Male and Female online at the Magnus Hirschfeld Archive for Sexology, Humboldt University, Berlin which houses many items associated with Harry Benjamin.
 A video tribute to Harry Benjamin by SexSmartFilms.com, an organization dedicated to the promotion of sexual literacy.

1885 births
1986 deaths
American centenarians
American sexologists
American people of German-Jewish descent
German centenarians
Men centenarians
German people of Jewish descent
German endocrinologists
German sexologists
Transgender studies academics
German emigrants to the United States
Transgender and medicine